Quatre Bras (French for crossroads; literally "four arms") is a hamlet in the municipality of Genappe, Wallonia, Belgium. It lies on the crossroad of the Charleroi–Brussels road (currently named N5) and the Nivelles–Namur road south of Genappe.

On June 16, 1815 near the crossroads of Quatre Bras, the Battle of Quatre Bras (part of the Waterloo Campaign) was fought between contingents of the Anglo-Allied army and the left wing of the French Army. There are several monuments to the battle at Quatre Bras.

References

Further reading
 

Genappe
Populated places in Walloon Brabant